Pupin is a tiny lunar impact crater located in the eastern part of the Mare Imbrium. It was named after Serbian-American physicist Mihajlo Pupin. It lies to the southeast of the crater Timocharis, and was identified as Timocharis K prior to being renamed by the IAU. The mare near Pupin is otherwise devoid of significant impact craters, and is nearly featureless except for a faint dusting of ray material.

References

 
 
 
 
 
 
 
 
 
 
 

Impact craters on the Moon
Mare Imbrium